Lismore was a constituency represented in the Irish House of Commons until 1800.

Members of Parliament
1613–1615 Sir Richard Boyle and Francis Annesley
1634–1635 James Barry, later Lord Barry and Stephen Crowe
1639–1649 Sir John Browne and Stephen Crowe
1661–1666 Adam Loftus and William Fitzgerald

1692–1801

Notes

References

Constituencies of the Parliament of Ireland (pre-1801)
Historic constituencies in County Waterford
1800 disestablishments in Ireland
Constituencies disestablished in 1800